The Swedish Bar Association is an organisation for Swedish lawyers, including members of the Bar practicing law, under the title of advokat, a title which is protected by Swedish law and reserved for the exclusive use by the members of the Association.

Since 1981, the association is located at Tryggerska villan in Diplomatstaden, Stockholm.

See also
 Advocate
 Law of Sweden

External links
 Swedish Bar Association
Charter of the Swedish Bar Association (PDF)
Code of Conduct for Members of the Swedish Bar Association issued by the Board of the Swedish Bar Association on 29 August 2008
"The Swedish Bar Association: Some Salient Features of the Legal Profession in Sweden" (originally published in From Scandinavian Studies in Law, Vol. 46).

Law of Sweden
Bar associations of Europe
Year of establishment missing